New Relic is an information technology company which develops cloud-based software to help website and application owners track the performance of their services.

History

Foundation and early years
Lew Cirne founded New Relic in 2008 and became the company's CEO. The name "New Relic" is an anagram of founder Lew Cirne's name. In 2008, NetworkWorld Magazine named the company as one of its 10 management startups to watch.

In January 2010, tech publication CRN named New Relic as one of its Top 20 Coolest Cloud Infrastructure Vendors. 

On November 5, 2012, CA Technologies filed a lawsuit claiming that New Relic violated three patents that came into CA Technologies' possession through the acquisition of Wily Technology (a company also founded by Lew Cirne). 

In February 2013, New Relic raised $80 million from investors including Insight Venture Partners, T. Rowe Price, Benchmark Capital, Allen & Company, Trinity Ventures, Passport Capital, Dragoneer, and Tenaya Capital at a valuation of $750 million. The funding round helped New Relic extend its software analytics platform to include Android and iOS native mobile apps. In October 2013, the company announced that it was converting its software analytics product into a SaaS model, code named Rubicon.

In April 2014, New Relic raised another $100 million in funding led by BlackRock, Inc., and Passport Capital, with participation from T. Rowe Price Associates, Inc. and Wellington Management. The company went public on December 12, 2014.

Recent history
In January 2020, the company announced that Bill Staples was joining the company as Chief Product Officer on February 14, 2020. According to the announcement, he was to lead the product management, engineering and design functions, as well as drive the company's platform strategy. In March, the company inked a 10-year deal to move its Atlanta team out of co-working space into the 20th floor of a 28-story office tower off 12th Street in Midtown. In June, the company combined two teams in its Portland engineering office and reportedly laid off less than 20 employees with overlapping positions. Also in June, amid internal disagreements about how the company should respond to systemic racism in society, former CEO Lew Cirne sent a memo stating that Black Lives Matter discussions were "off-the-table". In July, New Relic announced it was replacing all of its legacy products with a full stack platform, priced by user rather than by server, with the goal of simplifying things for its customers. The new platform was called New Relic One. In October, the Oregonian reported unhappiness within the company's employees, stemming from ongoing concerns about the company's response to the ongoing racial justice movement, and also due to controversial donations made by Cirne to an anti-gay Christian school and an anti-Jewish evangelist. In December, the company acquired Pixie Labs, a service for monitoring cloud-native workloads running on Kubernetes clusters.

In April 2021, New Relic reportedly laid off nearly 160 employees, as part of a restructuring plan to move away from its software subscription sales model to a consumption based model. In May, Bill Staples was promoted to CEO, and Cirne transitioned to executive chairman. In October, the company acquired CodeStream, a developer collaboration tool.  

In February 2022, the company released infrastructure monitoring software to help DevOps, site reliability engineering (SRE) and ITOps teams monitor issues across public, private and hybrid cloud environments. In May, the company launched a vulnerability management tool for security, DevOps, security operations (SecOps) and SRE teams.

Products
New Relic's technology, delivered in a software as a service (SaaS) model, monitors Web and mobile applications in real-time with support for custom-built plugins to collect arbitrary data.

Operations
New Relic is headquartered in San Francisco. Its CEO as of May 2021 is Bill Staples, and Lew Cirne is the company's executive chairman. As of March 2022, the company reported 2,217 employees.

The company partners with companies including IBM Bluemix, Amazon Web Services, CloudBees, Engine Yard, Heroku, Joyent, Rackspace Hosting, and Microsoft Azure as well as mobile application backend service providers Appcelerator, Parse, and StackMob.

In 2012 and 2013, the San Francisco Business Times profiled New Relic as a best place to work in the Bay Area.

References

External links

 New Relic

Software companies established in 2008
Software companies based in the San Francisco Bay Area
Companies based in San Francisco
Website monitoring software
Cloud applications
Companies listed on the New York Stock Exchange
2014 initial public offerings
American companies established in 2008
Software companies of the United States